This is a list of defunct airlines of Italy.

See also
 List of airlines of Italy

References

External links
 

Italy
Airlines
Airlines, defunct